USS Undaunted may refer to the following ships of the United States Navy:

  an Undaunted-class fleet tug built in 1917 and struck in 1946
   built in 1944 and transferred to NOAA in 1963

See also
HMS Undaunted

United States Navy ship names